Rollerball is a 2002 American science fiction sports film directed by John McTiernan. A remake of the 1975 film of the same name, based on William Harrison's short story Roller Ball Murder, the film stars Chris Klein, Jean Reno, LL Cool J, Rebecca Romijn and Naveen Andrews. Unlike the previous film, it has a much greater focus on action, with more muted social and political overtones than the original, and takes place in the present rather than in a future dystopian society.

Rollerball was released on February 8, 2002. Upon its release, the film was critically panned, receiving criticism for the lack of the original's social critique. It was a box office bomb, grossing $25 million against a production budget of $70 million.

Plot

In 2005, the new sport of Rollerball, an extraordinarily violent extension of roller derby involving motorcycles and a metal ball, becomes hugely popular in many countries. Marcus Ridley invites NHL hopeful Jonathan Cross to join him playing for the Zhambel Horsemen in Kazakhstan. The highly paid Marcus and Jonathan are teamed with low-paid locals, who are often severely injured in the game.

In the beginning, Jonathan, the team's star player and the poster child of promoter Alexi Petrovich, is enamored by the high-octane sport, the popularity, sports cars, and his female teammate Aurora. But Jonathan and Ridley eventually discover that the cynical Alexi and his opportunistic assistant, Sanjay, have a vested interest in keeping the game as popular as possible, through planned gory "accidents" and ensuring that Jonathan and Ridley cannot quit the team and remain high-profile stars.

After an accident almost kills Aurora, Jonathan and Ridley decide that they need to flee the country to save their lives. The two are followed by Alexi and several bodyguards, who attack the two before they can reach the Russian border. Jonathan is injured and Ridley has to leave him behind. Alexi and his men capture Jonathan and kill Ridley after the latter successfully crosses the border.

Following the escape attempt, Alexi tries to stage a public execution of Jonathan by removing all the rules from the upcoming Rollerball match, along with trading Aurora to the opposing team (as requested by Jonathan in an attempt to get her away from danger). However, Jonathan, with the help of his teammates, start a revolution, causing the fans to see the sport for what it really is, and ultimately to kill Alexi.

Cast
 Chris Klein as Jonathan Cross
 Jean Reno as Alexi Petrovich
 LL Cool J as Marcus Ridley
 Rebecca Romijn as Aurora "The Black Widow"
 Naveen Andrews as Sanjay
 Mike Dopud as Michael "The Assassin" Uglich
 Andrew Bryniarski as Halloran
 Kata Dobó as Katya Dobolakova
 Lucia Rijker as Lucia Ryjker
 Oleg Taktarov as Oleg "Denny" Denekin
 Paul Heyman as Sports Announcer
 Janet Wright as Coach Olga

The film features cameo appearances by Pink, Slipknot, and Shane McMahon.

Production

Although the first draft of the script was considered by many to be very good and even superior to the original film, director John McTiernan didn't like it because it focused more on social commentary, while he thought that the audience would like to see more of the Rollerball scenes. This was why he had the original script completely re-written several times and made sure that it focused more on WWE-like showmanship, including crazy costumes and stunts while changing the film's storyline from a modern-day success story to a classic underdog story and changing the name of the main character in the film from Jonathan E. to Jonathan Cross as well.

The movie was filmed in about 15 weeks, between July 24 and November 2000. McTiernan's first cut, which was over two hours long, was test screened in Las Vegas around April or May 2001, and got a very negative response from test audiences. The release date was then pushed back from May to July 13, 2001, by MGM to test the movie again, hoping that they would find the right audience for it.
 
Harry Knowles from Ain't it Cool News was invited by McTiernan for a test screening of the film in Long Island sometime after the first test screening, and in his review of McTiernan's original cut, Knowles said that the movie was bad but at least it was an unapologetic hard-R film with much nudity and some brutal violence in Rollerball scenes, but even as a workprint it was obvious how poorly the action scenes were edited, and the story was bad. "The 'Rollerball' edit I saw was one of the worst films I'd seen in my life. There was jeering in the theater," Knowles said. Knowles was also one of the people who read the original first draft of the script (one that McTiernan rejected) and he said that it was an amazing script which solved all the problems of the original film.

Following the negative test screenings, MGM ordered massive re-shoots and re-edits to be done on the film in the middle of 2001. Shortly after the test screenings, MGM appointed a new head of marketing and distribution, Robert Levin, who convinced McTiernan to let go of the summer release date. This would give the studio more time to devise a better marketing strategy and allow McTiernan to do re-shoots and to re-edit the film for a PG-13 rating, in an attempt by the studio to get a wider audience to see the film. The release date was then pushed back again from August all the way to February 2002, due to all the post production work causing delays. McTiernan shot two weeks of additional footage in late 2001 to clarify certain scenes, especially the film's ending, and also cut down the violence and all the nudity.

On orders from the studio, around 30 minutes were cut out of the original rough cut of the film and the entire ending was re-shot and changed. Some of the cuts were made because MGM thought the movie was "too Asian".
In the original ending, Petrovich gets killed by Sanjay and Jonathan and Aurora fly back to the US, during which Jonathan says that he will continue playing the Rollerball game in the US, and how he is now part owner of the game.

Some of the scenes that were cut for the PG-13 rating, but were never put back even in later DVD and Blu-ray so called R rated versions of the film, include lots more blood in all the Rollerball scenes and parts like skulls getting smashed, bones getting broken, teeth flying out, a scene where Aurora is topless and walks towards Jonathan in the locker room originally didn't have a shadow over her (this was added in post production to cover her up for the PG-13 rating), their sex scene was also longer, and so was their conversation while they are lying down in a sauna. Some of the other similar edits that were done on more graphic scenes in the film include digitally replacing blood spurts with sweat.

Some of the action scenes were also longer in the original cut and/or edited differently or re-shot, such as the opening scene in San Francisco which was partially re-shot after the original version of it was considered to be too confusing due to the editing.

The infamous night vision sequence was actually a re-shot version of the scene. After realizing that they shot the original version of the scene to look too dark, filmmakers had to return and re-shoot the entire sequence, delaying the movie's release for six months. Due to the issues with the budget, this scene could not be finished properly, thus it was decided to add green visual tint to the scene to make the scene look like it was shot in night vision, despite the lack of point in giving it that look.

The original score by Brian Transeau was also removed, purportedly because it sounded "too Arabic", and was replaced with a new score by Éric Serra. Also, some of the other music was changed or removed from the first cut of the film.

Reception
Rollerball was panned by critics. On Rotten Tomatoes the film has an approval rating of 3% based on 118 reviews, with an average rating of 2.55/10. The site's consensus reads, "Removing the social critique of the original, this updated version of Rollerball is violent, confusing, and choppy. Klein makes for a bland hero." On Metacritic the film has a score of 14 out of 100 based on reviews from 28 critics, indicating "overwhelming dislike". Audiences surveyed by CinemaScore gave the film a grade B− on scale of A to F.

Time Out'''s Trevor Johnson described it as "a checklist shaped by a 15-year-old mallrat: thrashing metal track, skateboards, motorbikes, cracked heads and Rebecca Romijn with her top off". Chicago Sun-Times reviewer Roger Ebert called it "an incoherent mess, a jumble of footage in search of plot, meaning, rhythm and sense". The film's lead, Chris Klein, was also a subject of criticism and ridicule, being referred to as a bland hero.

Box office
The film was a box-office flop, earning a worldwide total of $25.9 million compared to a production budget of $70 million. In 2014, the Los Angeles Times listed the film as one of the most expensive box office flops of all time.

Accolades
Rebecca Romijn was nominated for a Golden Raspberry Award as Worst Supporting Actress, where she lost to Madonna for her cameo in Die Another Day. At the 2002 Stinkers Bad Movie Awards, the film won the awards for Worst Director (McTiernan), Worst Remake, and Worst Female Fake Accent (Romijn-Stamos). Romijn-Stamos was also nominated for Worst Actress but lost to Madonna for Swept Away.

The creator of Rollerball, science fiction author William Harrison, said, "I've never watched the 2002 incarnation of Rollerball, and have no interest in it."

Controversy

In 2013, director John McTiernan was sent to federal prison for making a false statement to an FBI investigator in February 2006 about his hiring the private investigator Anthony Pellicano to illegally wiretap Charles Roven, the producer of the film, around August 2000. McTiernan (who was released in 2014) had been in a disagreement with Roven about what type of film Rollerball'' should be, and had hired Pellicano to investigate Roven's intentions and actions.

Soundtrack 
The score was released, but the soundtrack was not.

 "Boom" – P.O.D.
 "Told You So" – Drowning Pool
 "Ride" – Beautiful Creatures
 "Millionaire" – Rappagariya
 "I Am Hated" – Slipknot
 "Body Go" – Hardknox
 "Feel So Numb" – Rob Zombie
 "Keep Away" – Godsmack 
 "Insane in the Brain" – Sen Dog
 "Flashpoint" – Fear Factory
 "When I Come Around" – Green Day
 "Crawling in the Dark" – Hoobastank
 "Time to Play" – Pillar
 "Never Gonna Stop (The Red Red Kroovy)" – Rob Zombie

References

External links
 
 

2002 films
2002 science fiction action films
Remakes of American films
American science fiction action films
German science fiction films
Japanese science fiction films
Films scored by Éric Serra
Films about competitions
Films shot in Minnesota
Films based on science fiction short stories
Films directed by John McTiernan
Films set in 2005
Films set in Kazakhstan
Films shot in Wyoming
Roller derby films
Roller skating films
Films with screenplays by Larry Ferguson
Atlas Entertainment films
Columbia Pictures films
Metro-Goldwyn-Mayer films
Films about death games
Films produced by John McTiernan
2000s English-language films
2000s American films
2000s Japanese films
2000s German films